Māra is a Latvian feminine given name. The associated name day is March 25.

Goddess Māra
https://en.wikipedia.org/wiki/M%C4%81ra

Notable people named Māra
Māra Grīva (born 1989), Latvian athlete
Māra Zālīte (born 1952), Latvian writer

References 

Latvian feminine given names
Feminine given names